Čirč is a village and municipality in Stará Ľubovňa District in the Prešov Region of northern Slovakia.

History
In historical records the village was first mentioned in 1773.

Geography
The municipality lies at an elevation of 505 meters (1,657 ft) and covers an area of 20.187 km2 (7.794 mi2). It has a population of about 1,155.

Genealogical resources

The records for genealogical research are available at the state archive "Statny Archiv in Presov, Slovakia"

 Roman Catholic church records (births/marriages/deaths): 1777-1949 (parish B)
 Greek Catholic church records (births/marriages/deaths): 1753-1933 (parish A)

See also
 List of municipalities and towns in Slovakia

External links
Čirč - The Carpathian Connection
http://www.statistics.sk/mosmis/eng/run.html
http://www.tjcirc.szm.sk
Surnames of living people in Circ

Villages and municipalities in Stará Ľubovňa District
Šariš